Linna may refer to:

Places
Linna, Ida-Viru County, village in Jõhvi Parish, Ida-Viru County, Estonia
Linna, Valga County, village in Helme Parish, Valga County, Estonia

Given name
Linna Vogel Irelan (1846–1935), German-born American potter and author

Surname
Linna (surname)

See also
Lina (disambiguation)
Lenna (disambiguation)